Winslow station is an Amtrak train station at 501 East Second Street in Winslow, Navajo County, Arizona, United States.  It is served daily by Amtrak's Southwest Chief between Chicago, Illinois and Los Angeles, California. The Santa Fe Depot and La Posada Hotel Harvey House compound are the centerpiece of the La Posada Historic District (established 1992).

Architecture
The Santa Fe Railway station was built in 1929, and the adjacent La Posada Hotel and Gardens was completed in 1930.

Both were designed by renowned architect Mary Jane Colter. She is the architect of various notable Fred Harvey Company buildings, including others at the South Rim of the Grand Canyon and in New Mexico. She considered La Posada Hotel as her integrated interior/exterior masterpiece.

Hotel
La Posada Hotel, and the depot, combine elements of the Mission Revival and Spanish Colonial Revival architecture styles. Characteristic Colter designed features include shaded colonnades and arcades, restaurants, red clay tile roofs above massed stuccoed walls, courtyards and acres of gardens, custom furniture, and decorative wrought ironwork throughout. The hotel building had two main entrances, a southern one on train platform and a northern one on the street for local people and U.S. Route 66 travelers.

La Posada is one of the last of a series of hotel-depot complexes built across the Southwestern United States in a collaboration between Fred Harvey and the Atchison, Topeka and Santa Fe Railway.

The hotel was closed in 1957, turned into offices, and later abandoned.

Bought in 1997 to save it, it was substantially restored  to reopen as a historic hotel and restaurant complex. Further restoration of the buildings and historic gardens is ongoing. A parking lot and field east of the hotel totaling  is being converted into a sculpture garden, orchard, and potager garden by the Winslow Arts Trust (WAT).

The Turquoise Room, the hotel's restaurant, was rated as one of the top 3 restaurants in the United States by Conde Naste in 2009.  The Tina Mion Museum exhibits Mion's contemporary paintings in the hotel's former  ballroom.

La Posada Hotel is mentioned in the Lost Dogs song "Goodbye Winslow" about traveling Route 66, on their album Old Angel.

Depot
The Santa Fe Depot building serves as the present day Winslow Amtrak station. It was also renovated by the Winslow Arts Trust to house the Route 66 Art Museum, celebrating the culture of Winslow and the historic U.S. Route 66 in Arizona corridor. In June 2016, work began to convert the depot section into a fine art museum.

Downtown Winslow
Attractions near La Posada Hotel in adjacent historic Downtown Winslow include:
 Old Trails Museum, in a 1920 bank building.
 Snowdrift Art Space, in the 1914 Babbitt Brothers department store building.
 Standin' on the Corner Park
 Winslow Visitor Center, in the former 1917 Winslow Hubble Trading Post building.

See also
 La Posada Historic District
 Mary Jane Colter Buildings

References

External links

 USA Rail Guide – TrainWeb: Winslow Amtrak Station
 La Posada Hotel website

Amtrak stations in Arizona
Hotels in Arizona
Winslow, Arizona
Atchison, Topeka and Santa Fe Railway stations in Arizona
Atchison, Topeka and Santa Fe Railway hotels
Buildings and structures in Navajo County, Arizona
Buildings and structures on U.S. Route 66
Railway stations in the United States opened in 1929
Historic district contributing properties in Arizona
Railway stations on the National Register of Historic Places in Arizona
Transportation in Navajo County, Arizona
1929 establishments in Arizona
Mary Colter buildings
Mission Revival architecture in Arizona
Spanish Colonial Revival architecture in Arizona
National Register of Historic Places in Navajo County, Arizona